Hoyos del Collado is a municipality located in the province of Ávila, Castile and León, Spain. According to the 2006 census (INE), the municipality has a population of 39 inhabitants.  It is known for its merino sheep, whose wool is used for weaving and knitting.  There are 10 people involved in the raising of the sheep.  Some of the sheep winter in Extremadura and some stay in Hoyos the whole year.  Cattle are also raised and there several people raise chickens, turkeys, geese and other fowl.  It is a peaceful, friendly village with several springs, a river nearby and mountain views.

References

Municipalities in the Province of Ávila